Petrović is a South Slavic language patronymic surname literally meaning Peter's son, equivalent to the English last name of Peterson. In Eastern Slavic naming customs its counterpart is "Petrovich".
 
The surname Petrović is particularly tied to Serbian nationality; the majority of Petrovićs come from Serbia (83% of them) and the Serbian Royal Family's original surname is "Petrović", originating from Karađorđe Petrović.  

Petrović is the second most frequent surname in Serbia, it is also ranked in the first 10 in Montenegro and is also the 11th most common in Croatia, with 9,614 carriers (2011 census). It is the third most common surname in the Osijek-Baranja County, the fourth most common in the Primorje-Gorski Kotar County and ninth most common in the City of Zagreb.

Notable people
Aleksandar Petrović (footballer, born 1914) (1914–87), former Serbian football player and manager
Aleksandar Petrović (film director) (1929–1994), Serbian film director
Aleksandar Petrović (basketball, born February 1959), Croatian professional basketball coach and former player
Aleksandar Petrović (basketball, born October 1959) (1959–2014), Serbian professional basketball coach
Aleksandar Petrović (basketball, born 1972), Macedonian professional basketball coach
Aleksandar Petrović (basketball, born 1987), Serbian professional basketball player
Aleksandar Petrović (footballer, born 1983) (born 1983), Serbian professional football right-back currently playing for FK Čukarički Stankom in the Serbian SuperLiga
Aleksandar Petrović (footballer, born 1985) (born 1985), Serbian footballer currently playing for Serbian SuperLiga club FK Rad Belgrade
Aleksandar R. Petrović (born 1985), Serbian footballer who recently played for Hajduk Kula
Aleksandro Petrović (born 1988), Bosnian/German footballer
Alex Petrovic (born 1992), Canadian ice-hockey player
Biljana Petrović (born 1961), Serbian high jumper
Branimir Petrović (born 1982), Serbian footballer
Danilo II Petrović-Njegoš (1826–60), Serbian Prince
Danilo Petrović (tennis) (born 1992), Serbian tennis player
Draško Petrović (born 1965), current CEO of Telekom Srbija
Dražen Petrović (1964–93), Croatian basketball player
Dušan Petrović (born 1966), Serbian politician
Goran Petrović (born 1961), Serbian writer
Jovana Petrović (boen 2001), Serbian women's football goalkeeper
Karađorđe Petrović (1768–1817), leader of the first Serbian uprising
Leo Petrović (1883–1945), Herzegovinian Croat historian
Ljupko Petrović (born 1947), Serbian football coach
Madeleine Petrovic (born 1956), Austrian politician
Mihailo Petrović (disambiguation), several people
Milovan Petrović (born 1990), Macedonian footballer
Miodrag "Čkalja" Petrović (1924–2003), Serbian actor
Mirko Petrović (politician) (born 1965), Serbian politician and current CEO of Dunav osiguranje
Nadja Petrovic (born 1991), Macedonian painter
Nataša Petrović (born 1988), Macedonian actress of Serbian descent
Nenad Petrović (chess composer) (1907–89), Croatian chess problemist
Nenad Petrović (writer) (born 1925), Serbian writer
Nikola I Petrović-Njegoš (1841–1921), Prince of Montenegro
Ognjen "Olja" Petrović (1948–2000), Serbian goalkeeper (football)
Petar I Petrović-Njegoš (1747–1830), Prince-Bishop
Petar II Petrović-Njegoš (1813–51), Prince-Bishop
Radič Petrović (1738–1816), Serbian Revolutionary
Radosav Petrović (born 1989), Serbian footballer
Roman Petrović (1896–1947), Bosnian expressionist painter
Saša Petrović (actor) (born 1962), Bosnian actor
Saša Petrović (footballer) (born 1966), former Montenegrin football goalkeeper
Sava II Petrović-Njegoš (1702–82), Prince-Bishop of Montenegro
Sava Petrović (botanist) (1839–1889), botanist
Stanojlo Petrović(1813–1894) Serbian high-ranking officer and public benefactor
Hajduk Veljko Petrović (c. 1780–1813), known simply as Hajduk-Veljko, one of the vojvodas of the Serbian Revolutionary forces in the First Serbian Uprising against the Ottoman Empire
Veljko Petrović (poet) (1884–1967), Serbian poet
Vladimir "Pižon" Petrović (born 1955), Serbian footballer and coach
Vladimir Petrović (footballer, born 1972) (born 1972), Croatian footballer
Željko Petrović (born 1965), Montenegrin footballer and current coach
Zoran Petrović (referee) (born 1952), Serbian football referee
Zoran Petrović (writer) (born 1954), Serbian writer

See also
 House of Petrović-Njegoš
 Ninth Belgrade Gymnasium "Mihailo Petrović-Alas", high school in Belgrade, Serbia.

References

Croatian surnames
Montenegrin surnames
Serbian surnames
South Slavic-language surnames
Patronymic surnames
Surnames from given names